Byt may refer to:
BYuT Yulia Tymoshenko Bloc, a Ukrainian political coalition
"Byt" ("The Flat"), a short 1968 film by Jan Švankmajer